List of Ladies' Gaelic footballers features notable players of ladies' Gaelic football.

2010 LGFA/TG4 Team of the Decade

TG4 Senior Player's Player of the Year

2014 RTÉ Sports Team of the Year
In December 2014, after winning their ninth All-Ireland Senior Ladies' Football Championship title, the Cork senior ladies' football team won the RTÉ Sports Team of the Year Award. They were the first female team to win the award. They received 27% of the vote, beating the Ireland men's national rugby union team, winners of the 2014 Six Nations Championship, by 11%.

Players who switched codes

Ladies' Gaelic football to association football

Ladies' Gaelic football to Australian rules football

Ladies' Gaelic football to camogie

Ladies' Gaelic football to field hockey

Notes
  Nicola Daly and Deirdre Duke were both members of the Ireland team that won the silver medal at the 2018 Women's Hockey World Cup
  Deirdre Duke represented Dublin at under-14 level.
  Dora Gorman represented Ireland at under-16 and under-18 level.
  Sarah Hawkshaw represented Dublin at under-16 level.

Ladies' Gaelic football to netball
At the 2015 Nations Cup tournament the Northern Ireland national netball team featured three ladies' Gaelic football inter-county captains – Caroline O'Hanlon (Armagh), Neamh Woods (Tyrone) and Laura Mason (Down). At the 2019 Netball World Cup, of the twelve players that featured in the  Northern Ireland squad, seven were ladies' Gaelic footballers. These included O'Hanlon, Woods,   Emma Magee, Michelle Magee, Ciara Crosbie, Michelle Drayne and Gemma Lawlor.

Notes
  Ciara Crosbie represented Down at youth level.

Ladies' Gaelic football to rugby union

References

 
Gaelic football